is a private junior college, located in Izumi-ku, Sendai, Miyagi Prefecture, Japan.

History
The Yoshida Higher Girls School was opened in 1930. It was registered as a private junior college in 1951 and changed its name to its current name at that time. The school moved to its present campus in 1988.

Organization
 School of Business Information Systems
Department of Childcare and Welface

External links
 Official website 

Japanese junior colleges
Educational institutions established in 1951
Private universities and colleges in Japan
Universities and colleges in Miyagi Prefecture
Women's universities and colleges in Japan
Buildings and structures in Sendai
1951 establishments in Japan